Serratifusus excelens is a species of sea snail, a marine gastropod mollusk in the family Buccinidae, the true whelks.

Etymology
Named after the Latin expression excelens (sic - should be excellens) (adjective), meaning "high, exalted, lofty".

Description
The length of the shell attains 36.4 mm.

Distribution
This marine species occurs off New Caledonia (depth range: 370 -405 m).

References

 Fraussen, K.; Hadorn, R. (2003). Six new Buccinidae (Mollusca: Gastropoda) from New Caledonia. Novapex. 4(2-3): 33-50

External links

Buccinidae
Gastropods described in 2003